Ancient Aliens is an American television series that explores the pseudoscientific ancient astronauts hypothesis, as well as other pseudoscientific and psuedohistoric topics such as advanced ancient civilizations, extraterrestrial contact and ufology, and alleged conspiracy theories, in a non-critical documentary format. Episodes begin and end with rhetorical questions which frame the explored topics. The series has aired on History and other A&E Networks since 2010, and has been a target for criticism of History's channel drift, and criticism for promoting unorthodox or unproven hypotheses as fact. All episodes are narrated by Robert Clotworthy. The series is produced by Prometheus Entertainment.

The series is based on and inspired by the works of Erich von Däniken and Zecharia Sitchin, among other writers. The works of Graham Hancock, Robert Bauval, Brinsley Le Poer Trench, Charles Hapgood, and Edgar Cayce are also referenced in many episodes. Producer Giorgio Tsoukalos and writer David Childress are often featured as guests.

The series began as a two-hour documentary special in 2009 and continued for three seasons as a flagship series on History. Seasons 4 to 7 aired on H2, with frequent re-airings of episodes on History and other A&E services. In 2015, the series returned to History after H2 was relaunched as Vice on TV. Season 15 premiered in 2020. The series continued with its sixteenth season in November 2020.

Series overview

Episodes

Pilot (2009)

Season 1 (2010)

Season 2 (2010)

Season 3 (2011)

Season 4 (2012)

Season 5 (2012–13)

Season 6 (2013)

Season 7 (2014)

Season 8 (2014)

Season 9 (2014–15)

Season 10 (2015)

Season 11 (2016)

Season 12 (2017)

Season 13 (2018–19)

Season 14 (2019)

Season 15 (2020)

Season 16 (2020–21)

Season 17 (2021)

Season 18 (2022)

Season 19 (2023)

References 

Lists of non-fiction television series episodes
Lists of American non-fiction television series episodes